The following is a '''list of islands of Vietnam:

From the north Vietnam to the south Vietnam.

Quảng Ninh Province coast
Trà Cổ (vi). Sa Vĩ Cap (vi) in Trà Cổ (vi) island is the North-Easternmost promontory of Vietnam 
Co To Islands 
Hạ Long Bay's islets 
Tuần Châu

Haiphong coast
Cát Bà Island 
Bạch Long Vĩ island

Quảng Trị Province coast
Cồn Cỏ

Quảng Nam Province coast
Cu lao Cham

Quảng Ngãi Province coast
Lý Sơn

Bình Định Province coast
Cu lao Xanh

Ninh Thuận Province coast
Hon Tai
Hon Deo
Hon Do (Red island)

Bình Thuận Province coast
Phú Quý 
Hon Cau
Hon Ghe
Ke Ga island
Hon Lao or Hon Ghenh
Hon Ba (Bình Thuận)

Bà Rịa–Vũng Tàu province coast
Long Sơn
Gò Găng
Bãi Ngựa
Cù lao Tào
Hon Ba (Vũng Tàu)
Côn Sơn Island (Côn Đảo)
Hon Trung islands
Hon Trung Lon (Big Egg)
Hon Trung Nho (Small Egg)

Ho Chi Minh city coast
Cần Giờ's fluvial islands
Thanh An island

Tiền Giang Province coast
Cồn Ngang

Trà Vinh Province coast
Cồn Nghêu

Cà Mau Province coast
Hon Da Bac
Hon Chuoi (Banana island)
Hon Khoai islands (Yam island)
Hon Khoai island
Hon Sao
Hon Doi Moi (Cà Mau Province)
Hon Da Le
Hon Tuong

Kiên Giang Province coast
Phú Quốc
Thổ Chu Islands
Hon Mot
An Thới Islands
Hon Ban or Hon Bang
Hon Thay Boi
Hon Doi Moi (Kiên Giang Province)
Hon Nghe
Hon Tre (Bamboo island)
Hon Rai hay Hon Son
Hà Tiên Islands
Bà Lụa Islands
Nam Du Islands

Territorial disputes in the South China Sea
Hoàng Sa (Paracel Islands) 
Trường Sa (Spratly Islands)

See also
List of islands
Geography of Vietnam

Vietnam
 
Islands